Landecker is a surname. Notable people with the surname include: 

Amy Landecker (born 1969), American actress
Hannah Landecker, American sociologist
John Records Landecker (born 1947), American disc jockey